Leslie Allison Godfree (27 April 1885 – 17 November 1971) was a British male tennis player who was especially successful in doubles and mixed doubles.

Biography 
Educated at Brighton College, Godfree played at the Wimbledon Championships from 1920 to 1930. While in singles he dropped out of the competition after the first or second round each year, he won the doubles title partnering Randolph Lycett in 1923. In January 1926, he married Kathleen McKane, a two time Wimbledon singles champion. In the same year, the newly married couple took the mixed doubles title at Wimbledon, being the only married couple ever to win this championship. Leslie had already reached the mixed doubles final two years earlier in 1924 where he was beaten by his future wife Kitty, and the couple would again in 1927.

Apart from Wimbledon, the Godfrees played at the French Championships in 1926 where they could advance to the semifinals in mixed doubles. In 1930, Godfree took part at the U.S. Championships where he reached the quarterfinals in mixed doubles, this time partnering Mercedes Malowe.

He was also member of the British Davis Cup team from 1923 to 1927 and competed at the 1924 Summer Olympics in Paris.

Grand Slam finals

Doubles (1 title)

Mixed doubles: (1 title, 2 runners-up)

References

External links 
 
 
 
 

1885 births
1971 deaths
Sportspeople from Brighton
English male tennis players
Wimbledon champions (pre-Open Era)
Grand Slam (tennis) champions in mixed doubles
Grand Slam (tennis) champions in men's doubles
Olympic tennis players of Great Britain
Tennis players at the 1924 Summer Olympics
British male tennis players
Tennis people from East Sussex